Restigouche (also known as Restigouche—Chaleur) was a federal electoral district in New Brunswick, Canada, that was represented in the House of Commons of Canada from 1867 to 1917 and from 1968 to 1997.

It was created by the British North America Act of 1867. It consisted of the County of Restigouche. It was abolished in 1914 when it was merged into Restigouche—Madawaska riding.

It was re-created in 1966 from Restigouche—Madawaska, consisting of the county of Restigouche and the parish of Beresford in the county of Gloucester. It was renamed "Restigouche—Chaleur" in 1989. The riding was abolished in 1996 when it was merged into Madawaska—Restigouche.

Members of Parliament

This riding elected the following Members of Parliament:

Election results

Restigouche—Chaleur, 1993–1997

Restigouche, 1968–1993

|-
 
|Liberal
|Maurice Harquail
|align="right"|9,158
|align="right"|51.6
|align="right"|-3.9
|-
 
| style="width: 150px" |Progressive Conservative
|Roger Caron
|align="right"|6,059
|align="right"|34.1
|align="right"|+13.2
|-

|New Democratic Party
|Edgar Dugas
|align="right"|1,392
|align="right"|7.8
|align="right"|-2.3
|-

|- bgcolor="white"
!align="left" colspan=3|Total
!align="right"|17,749
!align="right"|
!align="right"|

Restigouche, 1867–1917

By-election: On Mr. Moffatt's death, 25 April 1887

By-election: On Mr. Moffatt's resignation, Dec. 1877

By-election: On Mr. Caldwell's death, 29 September 1870

By-election: On Mr. McMillan being appointed Inspector of Post Offices in New Brunswick, and on his subsequent resignation

See also 

 List of Canadian federal electoral districts
 Past Canadian electoral districts

External links

Riding history from the Library of Parliament:
(1867 - 1914)
(1966 - 1989)
RESTIGOUCHE--CHALEUR, New Brunswick (1989 - 1996)

Former federal electoral districts of New Brunswick